The 1951 season was the 28th season of the Slovenian Republic League and the sixth in the SFR Yugoslavia. Korotan Kranj have defended the league title from the previous season.

Final table

Qualification for the Yugoslav Second League

External links
Football Association of Slovenia 

Slovenian Republic Football League seasons
Yugo
3
Yugo
3
Football